Moore, Oklahoma tornado may refer to:

1999 Bridge Creek–Moore tornado
2003 Moore–Choctaw tornado
2010 Moore–Choctaw tornado
2013 Moore tornado

List of Cleveland County, Oklahoma tornadoes - More tornadoes in Moore, Oklahoma